The city of Chennai in Tamil Nadu, India, is managed by the Corporation of Chennai. Established as Madras Corporation in 1688, it is the oldest municipal body in India. It is headed by a mayor, who presides over 200 councillors each of whom represents a ward.  The new mayor of Chennai will be elected on 4 March 2022.

Chennai Corporation absorbed seven municipalities, three town panchayats and 13 panchayat unions in Tiruvallur district and two municipalities, five town panchayats and 12 panchayat unions in Kanchipuram district. A total of nine municipalities merged into the city: Alandur, Ambattur, Kattivakkam, Madhavaram, Maduravoyal, Manali, Tiruvottiyur, Ullagaram-Puzhuthivakkam and Valasaravakkam. A total of eight town panchayats merged into the city: Chinnasekkadu, Puzhal, Porur, Nandambakkam, Meenambakkam, Perungudi, Pallikaranai, Sholinganallur. A total of twenty-five village panchayats merged into the city: Edayanchavadi, Sadayankuppam, Kadapakkam, Theeyampakkam, Mathur, Vadaperumbakkam, Surapet, Kathirvedu, Puthagaram, Nolambur, Karambakkam, Nerkundram, Ramapuram, Mugalivakkam, Manapakkam, Kottivakkam, Palavakkam, Neelankarai, Injambakkam, Karapakkam, Okkiyam-Thuraipakkam, Madipakkam, Jaladampet, Semmencherry, and Uthandi.

The expanded city contains 4.41 million voters and was re-organised into 15 zones consisting of 200 wards. The newly annexed areas were divided into 93 wards, and the remaining 107 wards were created out of the original 155 within the old city limits. , the new wards are yet to be named. Out of the 200 wards, 26 were reserved for scheduled castes and scheduled tribes and 58 were reserved for women.

Other Corporation in Chennai Metropolitan Area

Avadi Corporation

Tambaram Corporation

Kanchipuram Corporation

Zones

Proposed Zones

Other Constituencies in Chennai Metropolitan Area
Avadi
Pallavaram
Poonamallee
Tambaram
Thiruporur

Other Taluks in Chennai Metropolitan Area
Avadi
Poonamalee
Tambaram
Pallavaram
Vandalur

Municipalities in Chennai Metropolitan Area

Tiruvallur District

Poonamallee
Thiruverkadu
Thiruninravur

Kancheepuram District
Kunrathur
Mangadu

Chengalpattu District
Nandivaram-Guduvancheri
Maraimalainagar
Chengalpattu

Town Panchayats in Chennai Metropolitan Area

Tiruvallur District
Minjur
Naravarikuppam
Thirumazhisai
Gummidipoondi

Kancheepuram District
Sriperumbudur
Walajabad

Chengalpattu District
Thiruporur
Mamallapuram

See also

List of mayors of Chennai

References
General

 Official Zone wise executive engineers contact details
 Official zone details
Specific

External links
 Expansion of Chennai – Zone map
ECI - Chennai Assembly results

Zones
Chennai-related lists